ECS Electrochemistry Letters (EEL) is a monthly peer-reviewed scientific journal covering electrochemical science and technology. It was established in 2012 and is published by the Electrochemical Society. EEL ceased publication at the end of 2015. The editors-in-chief were Robert Savinell (Case Western Reserve University), Gerald S. Frankel (Ohio State University), Thomas F. Fuller (Georgia Tech), Charles L. Hussey (University of Mississippi), Shelley D. Minteer (University of Utah), Rangachary Mukundan (Los Alamos National Laboratory), Dennis G. Peters (Indiana University), John Weidner (University of South Carolina), and Martin Winter (University of Münster). According to the Journal Citation Reports, the journal has a 2014 impact factor of 1.789.

References

External links 
 

Electrochemistry journals
Academic journals published by learned and professional societies
Publications established in 2012
Monthly journals
English-language journals
Electrochemical Society academic journals